The following is a list of recurring Saturday Night Live characters and sketches introduced during the thirty-ninth season of SNL, which began on September 28, 2013.

Bruce Chandling
Kyle Mooney plays stand-up comedian Bruce Chandling.

An installment was scheduled to air on October 22, 2016, where Bruce talks about Halloween and brings on a fellow Comedian (Tom Hanks); the segment was cut from the episode before airing, but was released online.
Two filmed pieces with Kevin Hart and Louis C.K. respectively were also cut for time in Season 40.

Cinema Classics
Reese De'What (Kenan Thompson) presents classic cinema and television.

Mornin' Miami!
Three surly and unusually-named news anchors of a Miami-based morning news program (played by Kate McKinnon, Bobby Moynihan, and the host) cheerfully record their promos for the week for their off-screen producer (voiced by Vanessa Bayer).

An installment of Mornin' Miami! was scheduled to air on May 10, 2014, featuring host Charlize Theron; the sketch was cut from the episode before airing, but was released online.

Miss Meadows (poetry teacher)
Unusually perky poetry teacher Miss Meadows (Vanessa Bayer) visits students and teaches them about the joys of poetry. She reads her eccentric original poems to the group. Students take turns reading their odd original poems with one student (played by the host) using their poems to display their sexual attraction towards Meadows.

Miley tapes
A look in the fictional romance of Miley Cyrus and Kyle Mooney, which takes place during and after the filming of a homemade videotape. Bobby Moynihan and Beck Bennett interrupt the shooting, to which Kyle exits the room and confides in them that he doesn't really want to do what Miley wants him to do in the tape. Every time he opens the door after that, her actions and situations become more outlandish.

Shallon
A guest speaker (played by the Host) visits Astoria Elementary School to give a safety presentation, but finds that the loud, brash student Shallon (Nasim Pedrad) twists his lecture into an endorsement of whatever he's warning the children against (such as getting into cars with strangers) while the class' teacher Miss Finley (Kate McKinnon) is away doing something in her car. Shallon's actions would get her classmates (played by Aidy Bryant, John Milhiser, Bobby Moynihan, Kenan Thompson, and Noël Wells) into thinking that what Shallon says is right much to the chagrin of the guest speaker. When Miss Finley returns, the guest speaker leaves and makes a negative comment about the class. Afterwards, Miss Finley gives the children permission to go pursue the activity the guest speaker was attempting to discourage.

Holiday Food
The episode's host plays an eccentric character who talks about the food they'll be giving out on a certain holiday.

A third sketch themed around Thanksgiving, starring Kristen Wiig as "Wisten Kriig", was cut for time during the Season 42 episode dated November 18, 2016. Another sketch for St. Patrick's Day, with Bill Hader as Liam Neeson, was also cut for time in season 43 on March 17, 2018.

Heshy Farahat
Heshy Farahat (Nasim Pedrad) is a Yemeni motivational speaker who comes to speak at schools and hotels, etc. She often tells personal stories to motivate the audience, using hip thrusts and shooting-gun sound effects controlled by her son (Mike O'Brien).

Waking up with Kimye
Kanye West (Jay Pharoah) and Kim Kardashian (Nasim Pedrad) host a morning talk show with a typical daytime-talk-show format. Despite Kanye feeding Kim each of her lines to say in extremely obvious ways, she messes up most of them anyway. Kanye appears to be oblivious to Kim's ditziness, seeing her as both beautiful and brilliant. The other Kardashian sisters make giggling nasal-voiced appearances.

Jebidiah Atkinson
Jebidiah Atkinson (Taran Killam), a Weekend Update character, is an 1860s newspaper critic who has something negative to say about everything.

The character was inspired by an actual incident: On November 14, 2013, in honor of the 150th anniversary of Abraham Lincoln's Gettysburg Address, The Patriot-News retracted a scathing review of the address that its predecessor publication, The Patriot & Union, had published on November 24, 1863. Atkinson, ostensibly the author of that review, appeared on Weekend Update to defend his opinion. (The actual author was Oramel Barrett.)

The character has received critical acclaim from multiple reviewers. Mike Ryan of the Huffington Post said he would watch a Jebidiah Atkinson movie. Hitfix's Ryan McGee said that while performing the bit, Killam was on fire, even comparing Atkinson to Bill Hader's beloved Weekend Update character Stefon.

Richard Patterson (Baby Boss)
Dick Patterson (Beck Bennett) is a businessman who exhibits infantile reflexes. He is described by those who work for him as having "the body of a baby."

Animal Hospital (Vet Office)
Nurses (played by Kate McKinnon, Cecily Strong, and the host) work at a vet hospital and deliver the news of the pet's death to pet owners. The host plays a flamboyant nurse.

Family Feud
Steve Harvey (Kenan Thompson) hosts Celebrity Family Feud. 

An earlier version of this sketch aired in the season 35 episode hosted by Ryan Reynolds. It featured Jason Sudeikis as host Richard Dawson in a 1970s version of Family Feud between the Osmond family and the Phillips family.
Another version originally aired on January 21, 1978 (Season 3) featuring Bill Murray as Richard Dawson and the Coneheads as the contestants.

Bathroom Guy
A man (Jonah Hill) is called out for leaving a mess on the toilet in unlikely situations.

Black Jeopardy!
Kenan Thompson plays Darnell Hayes, host of a version of Jeopardy! where correct responses are stereotypes of working-class African American speech and thought. The host plays the contestant in the rightmost seat.

Dyke and Fats
Trailers from a fictional CBS buddy-cop show featuring Dutch Plains (Kate McKinnon) as lesbian cop Les Dykawitz, and Velvy O'Malley (Aidy Bryant) as food-loving cop Chubbina Fatzarelli. While they call one another "Dyke and Fats" and engage in stereotypical behavior, they won't tolerate that anyone else, including superior officers, call them by their nicknames.

Chris Fitzpatrick
Kyle Mooney plays Chris Fitzpatrick, an alternative high-schooler who makes videos featuring heavy metal music and public domain images of car crashes and buildings being demolished.

Leslie Jones
Leslie Jones appears as an expert on image and relationships on Weekend Update and flirts with host Colin Jost.

Whiskers R We
Middle-aged cat-lover Barbara DeDrew (McKinnon) and her girlfriend (the episode's host) showcase the cats that are ready to be adopted at Whiskers R We animal shelter. Barbara spends each commercial highlighting each cat's ridiculous backstory (for example, one cat is described as a ghost who died in 1940, another is described as a master of psychological manipulation) and fending off her girlfriend's awkward attempts at physical affection, which she is uncomfortable with on camera.

References

Lists of recurring Saturday Night Live characters and sketches
Saturday Night Live in the 2010s